Ignaców may refer to the following places in Poland:

In Łódź Voivodeship (central Poland)
Ignaców, Bełchatów County 
Ignaców, Brzeziny County 
Ignaców, Pajęczno County
Ignaców, Piotrków County 
Ignaców, Radomsko County

In Masovian Voivodeship (east-central Poland)
Ignaców, Gmina Błędów 
Ignaców, Gmina Jasieniec
Ignaców, Mińsk County

In Lublin Voivodeship (eastern Poland)
Ignaców, Zwoleń County in Masovian Voivodeship (east-central Poland)
Ignaców, Greater Poland Voivodeship (west-central Poland)
Ignaców, Lublin County
Ignaców, Włodawa County